Igor Vladimirovich Kvasha (4 February 1933 — 30 August 2012) was a Soviet and Russian  theater and film actor. He was a leading actor of Sovremennik Theater. Igor Kvasha was one of the Sovremennik founders along with Galina Volchek,  Oleg Yefremov, Yevgeniy Yevstigneyev and Oleg Tabakov. He was honored with People's Artist of Russia in 1978.

Biography 
Igor Kvasha was born in Moscow, the son of scientist Vladimir Ilich Kvasha, of the faculty of Mendeleev Russian University of Chemistry and Technology. Kvasha graduated from the Moscow Art Theater School, where he was taught by Aleksander Karev. After graduation, he joined the Moscow Art Theater troupe and performed there for two years (1955-1957). In 1957 he started work at the newly established Sovremennik Theater, where he remained.

In his last years, Kvasha hosted the TV talk show Wait for Me on Russia's Channel One. Kvasha himself acknowledges that he has got there accidentally.

He died in Moscow at the age of 79.

Selected filmography
 Sergeant Fetisov as Tavrizyan (1961)
 Adventures of a Dentist as Merezhkovsky (1965)
 Property of the Republic as Lagutin, ataman (1972)
 The Straw Hat as Lieutenant Emil Tavernier (1975)
 The Flight of Mr. McKinley as Director of SB-Salvatory (1975)
 Forever Alive as Vladimir (1976)
 The Very Same Munchhausen as burgomaster (1979)
 A Man from the Boulevard des Capucines as pastor Adams (1987)
 Passport  as Rabbi (1990)
 The Master and Margarita as Stravinsky (1994) 
 The First Circle as  Joseph Stalin (2006)
 The White Guard as narrator (2012)
 Ku! Kin-dza-dza as Yk, a carousel owner (2013)

Honours and awards
 Order For Merit to the Fatherland, 3rd class (30 March 2006) - for outstanding contribution to the development of theatre and many years of creative activity
 People's Artist of the USSR (1968)
 By the President of the Russian Federation (25 January 2008) - for his contribution to the development of Russian theater and film [6]
 National Prize actor Andrei Mironov "Figaro" in the "For Service to the Fatherland theatre"

References

External links

 Igor Kvasha at Peoples 
 Igor Kvashs at  Encyclopedia Slovary 

1933 births
2012 deaths
Male actors from Moscow
Soviet male film actors
Russian male film actors
Soviet male stage actors
Russian male stage actors
Russian television presenters
People's Artists of the RSFSR
Recipients of the Order "For Merit to the Fatherland", 3rd class
Burials in Troyekurovskoye Cemetery
Jewish Russian actors
Moscow Art Theatre School alumni